Victoria "Vicky" P. Garchitorena-Arpon is a Filipino civil society personality who has served as a senior government official and a former executive of the Ayala Corporation.

Mrs. Garchitorena headed the Presidential Management Staff in the early years of President Gloria Macapagal Arroyo. She now is a ranking stalwart of the Liberal Party of the Philippines as vice president for Women.

References

Liberal Party (Philippines) politicians
Living people
Filipino business executives
Heads of the Presidential Management Staff of the Philippines
Arroyo administration cabinet members
Ayala Corporation people
Year of birth missing (living people)